The Becher Point Wetlands site is a wetland nature reserve in Port Kennedy on the Swan Coastal Plain of south-western Western Australia. It comprises about 200 very small wetlands among sand ridges between Becher Point the Perth-Mandurah Road.

History and recognition
The nature reserve was established in 1996-97; the site is recognised as being of international importance under the Ramsar Convention on Wetlands, under which it was designated Ramsar Site 1048 on 5 January 2001.  The sedgelands of the site are listed as a threatened ecological community under the Commonwealth Environment Protection and Biodiversity Conservation Act 1999.  The site is also listed on Australia’s Register of the National Estate.

Description
The reserve lies on the beach ridge plains adjoining the coast at Becher Point. Its wetlands are within  of the Indian Ocean.  The wetlands are arranged in about ten groups roughly parallel to the coast, and separated by sand ridges.  The system contains examples of shrub swamps and seasonal marshes formed in a sequence of inter-dunal swales resulting from coastal advancement over the last three thousand years, a type of wetland system rare in Southwest Australia.  They form one of the youngest wetland systems on the Swan Coastal Plain and show a continuum of development in hydrology, geomorphology and vegetation unique in Western Australia.

The site’s wetlands are seasonal; they normally lack surface water in summer and autumn.

Flora and fauna

The swamps support sedgeland, tall open shrubland and low open forest or woodland.  The sedgeland is dominated by Baumea articulata, B. juncea, Typha spp. and Lepidosperma spp.  Schoenoplectus validus, Isolepis nodosa and Juncus kraussii also occur.  The forest and woodland is dominated by the paperbarks Melaleuca rhaphiophylla, M. hamulosa, M. cuticularis and M. teretifolia.  Surrounding areas support open heathland.

Native fauna found at the site include the quenda, southern carpet python and black-striped burrowing snake.  At least four species of frog and 21 reptiles have been recorded.

References

Further reading

 

Nature reserves in Western Australia
Ramsar sites in Australia
Swamps of Australia
Protected areas established in 1996
Swan Coastal Plain
Port Kennedy, Western Australia
Wetlands of Western Australia